Naif Mousa Saeed Almas (born 18 January 2000) is a Saudi Arabian professional footballer who plays as a defender for Pro League side Al-Fayha.

Honours

Club
Al-Nassr
 Saudi Super Cup: 2019

International
Saudi Arabia U20
 AFC U-19 Championship: 2018

References

External links

2000 births
Living people
Sportspeople from Riyadh
Association football defenders
Saudi Arabian footballers
Saudi Arabia youth international footballers
Saudi Arabia international footballers
Al Nassr FC players
Al Batin FC players
Al-Fayha FC players
Saudi Professional League players